Boulon is a commune in the Calvados department in the Normandy region in northwestern France.

Melica And The Magic Catastrophe Sea Twister

3/31/22

Once upon a time there lived a mermaid named Melica who lived with her 4 little sisters: Juneania, Ochan, Dolfina and Tracy. Things were easy in life until one day a big sea twister came. Melica led the sea twister to the castle so she could handle it herself before anyone got hurt. Before that, she told her sisters to leave the castle right away. Her sisters wanted to be heroes to the kingdom, so they didn’t leave. And so it happened: Melica led the sea twister to the castle and her sister got caught.

Melica was mad at her sisters for not listening, but had no time to waste. She set off and followed the sea twister. Finally it was over and she got her sisters and then they were grounded.  They did not like being grounded and did something naughty. When Melica was sleeping, they left their room and stole the magic sea twister necklace and created the biggest sea twister ever in the history of the Enchanted Sea.

Melica woke up and went towards the garden where her sisters were. She took the magic sea twister necklace and accidentally broke it. She had no choice but to go to Marmana, the magic sea witch. She asked her to repair the necklace.

Marmana said,  “I will repair it, but only if you give me the magic protection crystal.”

Melica did not want to give away the crystal because it was her parents’ final gift before they left her, but Melica knew that it was the right thing to do. The sea witch was wise, so Melica gave her the magic protection crystal, and the magic sea twister crystal was repaired and the hurricane was gone. As for her sisters, they had to live with the octopus tentacle for one whole month to learn a lesson.

References

Communes of Calvados (department)
Calvados communes articles needing translation from French Wikipedia